The 1904–05 season is the 31st season of competitive football by Rangers.

Overview
Rangers played a total of 33 competitive matches during the 1904–05 season. The team finished joint top of the league with Celtic, equal on points but with better goal difference. Since the concept of goal difference was not considered both teams played a Championship play-off which Celtic won 1–2.

The Scottish Cup campaign saw the team reach the final where they played Third Lanark. The final ended in a draw and Rangers lost the replay 1–3 at Hampden Park.

Results
All results are written with Rangers' score first.

Scottish League Division One

Championship play-off

Scottish Cup

Appearances

See also
 1904–05 in Scottish football
 1904–05 Scottish Cup

Rangers F.C. seasons
Rangers F.C.